The Lost Generation was an American soul group from Chicago, Illinois. The members began singing together in 1969 (after Jesse Dean completed time in the United States Army) and shortly after forming, Lowrell Simon's childhood friend, Gus Redmond (who was by that time promotional head at Brunswick Records), had the group record with producer Carl Davis. The result of these sessions was the single "The Sly, Slick and the Wicked", which became a hit in the US, and whose sales earned Brunswick Records enough profits to buy itself out and dissociate itself from its parent company, Decca Records, that same year. The group scored a few further hits, and disbanded in 1974, with members Brownlee and Fred Simon later joining Mystique, and Lowrell Simon embarking on a successful career as a solo artist. Larry Brownlee died in 1978; Fred Simon currently sings bass vocals with The Chi-Lites. Lowrell Simon died in 2018.

Members
Lowrell Simon (formerly of The Vondells; died 2018)
Fred Simon
Jesse Dean
Larry Brownlee (formerly of The C.O.D.s; died 1978)
Leslie Dean

Discography
The Sly, Slick and the Wicked (Brunswick Records, 1970)
The Young, Tough and Terrible (Brunswick Records, 1972)

Singles
"The Sly, Slick and the Wicked" (1970) US #30, US R&B Singles #14
"Wait a Minute" (1970) US R&B Singles #25
"Someday" (1971) US R&B Singles #48
"Talking the Teenage Language" (1971) US R&B Singles #35
"Your Mission (If You Decide to Accept It) Part I" (1974) US R&B Singles #65

References

Musical groups from Chicago
American soul musical groups
Musical groups established in 1969
Musical groups disestablished in 1974
1969 establishments in Illinois
1974 disestablishments in Illinois